The 2020 United States House of Representatives election in the United States Virgin Islands was held on Tuesday, November 3, 2020, to elect the non-voting Delegate to the United States House of Representatives from the United States Virgin Islands' at-large congressional district. The election coincided with the larger 2020 United States House of Representatives elections and the general election in the United States Virgin Islands.

The U.S. Virgin Island's non-voting delegate is elected for a two-year term in office. Incumbent delegate Stacey Plaskett, a Democrat who was first elected in 2014, was re-elected to a fourth term.

Candidates

Declared

Democratic Party
Stacey Plaskett, incumbent Delegate first elected in 2014.

Independent
Shekema M. George, independent candidate

General election

Results

References

United States Virgin Islands
2020
House